Villareal, officially the Municipality of Villareal, is a 4th class municipality in the province of Samar, Philippines. According to the 2020 census, it has a population of 27,394 people.

Geography

Barangays
Villareal is politically subdivided into 38 barangays.

Climate

Demographics

Economy

References

External links
 Villareal Profile at PhilAtlas.com
 [ Philippine Standard Geographic Code]
 Philippine Census Information
 Local Governance Performance Management System

Municipalities of Samar (province)